Mangarap Ka (International title: You Dreamed / ) is a Philippine afternoon television drama on ABS-CBN starring Piolo Pascual and Angelica Panganiban. It aired from March 22 to October 8, 2004.

Plot
A light drama with elements of action and adventure, "Mangarap Ka" marks a new direction for its makers ABS-CBN, which has created and perfected the teleserye genre over the years. Spotlighting the colorful sights and sounds of downtown Manila, "Mangarap Ka" is set in Quiapo, where we meet Oslec (Piolo Pascual), a street-smart young man whose life is about to be changed when he meets a lost young boy named Tikoy (newcomer Steven Christian Fermo).

Cast

Main cast 
Piolo Pascual as Celso "Oslec" Macapinlac Jr./Dragon King
Angelica Panganiban as Catherine Sita "Cutie" Carter
Steven Christian Fermo as Tikoy

Supporting cast 
Patrick Garcia as Tristan
Miles Ocampo as Pepe/Pepay
Rio Locsin as Jacqueline Catacutan Carter 
Nova Villa as Zoila Catacutan
Nanding Josef as Samuel
Ilonah Jean

See also
List of programs aired by ABS-CBN
List of telenovelas of ABS-CBN

References

ABS-CBN drama series
2004 Philippine television series debuts
2004 Philippine television series endings
Television series by Star Creatives
Filipino-language television shows
Television shows set in Manila